Grevillea christineae, commonly known as Christine's grevillea, is a species of flowering plant in the family Proteaceae and is endemic to the south-west of Western Australia. It is an erect, rounded shrub with wiry branches, linear to narrowly elliptic leaves, and white flowers.

Description

Taxonomy
Grevillea christineae was first formally described in 1986 by Donald McGillivray in his book New Names in Grevillea (Proteaceae) from specimens collected in 1979 near Goomalling by Alex George. The specific epithet (christineae) honours Christine Cornish, who assisted McGillivray.

Distribution and habitat
Grevillea christineae grows in woodland and shrubland in scattered populations between Watheroo and Goomalling in the Avon Wheatbelt, Geraldton Sandplains and Jarrah Forest biogeographic regions of south-western Western Australia.

Conservation status
This species is listed "endangered" under the Australian Government Environment Protection and Biodiversity Conservation Act 1999 and as "Threatened" by the Western Australian Government Department of Parks and Wildlife, meaning that it is in danger of extinction. The main threats to the species are damage or clearing during road maintenance work, inappropriate fire regimes and rubbish dumping.

References

christineae
Proteales of Australia
Flora of Western Australia
Taxa named by Donald McGillivray
Plants described in 1986